James Stephens is a Gaelic Athletic Association club located in Kilkenny, Ireland.  The club was founded in 1887 and has enjoyed equal success in both hurling and Gaelic football.

History

James Stephens was founded in 1887 as a hurling club. The club is named after James Stephens, founding member of the Irish Republican Brotherhood and took part in its first championship in 1888. The club was founded in the area of Patrick Street in Kilkenny city, an area locally known as 'the Village.'  The James Stephens colours of red and green were adopted as a result of the purchase of a set of jerseys from Erin's Own at a price of 30 shillings. The club's GAA grounds are currently located in Larchfield, Kilkenny and are currently being looked after by player/caretaker Ray Lahart

The club celebrated its 125-year anniversary with a book entitled ‘From the Arch to the Pump, James Stepehns GAA club 1887-2012’ written by Tommy Lanigan.

Hurling

Honours

All-Ireland Senior Club Hurling Championships: 3
 1976, 1982, 2005
Leinster Senior Club Hurling Championships: 4
 1975, 1981, 2004, 2005
Kilkenny Senior Hurling Championships: 9
 1935, 1937, 1969, 1975, 1976, 1981, 2004, 2005, 2011
 Beaten finalists - 8
 1927, 1970, 1973, 1982, 1983, 1996, 2008, 2009
 Kilkenny Senior Hurling League
 2018
Kilkenny Under-21 Hurling Championships: 7
 1969, 1970, 1987, 1993, 1994, 2000, 2002
Kilkenny Minor Hurling Championships: 13
 1929, 1957, 1966, 1968, 1970, 1971, 1982, 1985, 1986, 1991, 1992, 2003, 2012
 Kilkenny Junior Hurling Championships:
 1924, 1929, 1955, 2000

Famous Hurlers

This is a list of notable hurlers who have played for James Stephens.  Generally, this means players that have enjoyed much success with the club or have played for the Kilkenny senior hurling team.

Football

Honours

Kilkenny Senior Football Championships: 8
 1976, 1988, 1991, 1993, 1995, 1996, 2003, 2008
Kilkenny Minor Football Championships: 11
 1983, 1985, 1986, 1987, 1988, 1990, 1991, 1992, 1993, 1996, 1997, 2011, 2012, 2017

References

External links
Official James Stephens Website
Information On James Stephens

Gaelic games clubs in County Kilkenny
Hurling clubs in County Kilkenny
Gaelic football clubs in County Kilkenny